The J. C. Harrington Award was established in  by the Society for Historical Archaeology and is named in honor of J. C. Harrington (1901–1998), a pioneer founder of historical archaeology in North America. The award is presented for a "life-time of contributions to the discipline centered on scholarship". The award is an inscribed medal.  No more than one Harrington Award is presented each year.

List of medal recipients
Source: Society for Historical Archeology
1982 J. C. Harrington
1983 Charles H. Fairbanks
1984 John L. Cotter
1985 Kenneth E. Kidd
1986 George I. Quimby
1987 Arthur Woodward*, Stanley South
1988 Edward B. Jelks
1989 Bert Salwen* Carlyle Shreeve Smith
1991 Ivor Noël Hume
1993 Bernard L. Fontana
1995 Kathleen K. Gilmore
1997 James Deetz
1999 George F. Bass
2000 Roderick Sprague
2001 Roberta S. Greenwood
2002 Charles E. Cleland
2003 Merrick Posnansky
2004 Kathleen A. Deagan
2005 Marcel Moussette
2006 Donald L. Hardesty
2007 William Kelso
2008 James E. Ayres
2009 Robert L. Schuyler
2010 Judy Bense
2011 Pilar Luna Erreguerena
2012 George Miller
2013 Mary Beaudry
2014 Theresa A. Singleton
2015 Douglas D. Scott
2016 Mark P. Leone
2017 Leland Ferguson
2018 Julia A. King
2019 Charles E. Orser
2020 Henry M. Miller

* awarded posthumously

See also
 List of archaeology awards
 List of history awards

References

Academic awards
Archaeology awards